The Impossible Song & Other Songs is the third solo album by folk musician and Idlewild vocalist Roddy Woomble, released on 21 March 2011 on Greenvoe Records.

The album's artwork is by author and illustrator Mairi Hedderwick, noted for her series of children's books featuring Katie Morag.

The album entered the UK album chart at #73.

Background and recording
In the spring of 2008, Woomble moved to the Isle of Mull with his wife, Ailidh Lennon. Woomble notes: "We moved to Mull for the space, for the environment, but it's actually been the people that have been so important. My wife has family there. At first I knew no one at all, but the songs I've written have definitely been shaped by the people I've met. Sometimes I think it's odd how these songs came together quite quickly, then I think, well maybe it's not been quick at all, maybe it's taken me 34 years to get here and I just didn't realise it."

The album was recorded over four months at Mull's local arts centre, An Tobar, with Woomble enlisting thirteen musicians to assist in recording. Former Idlewild bassist Gavin Fox appears throughout the album, alongside Phil Cunningham, Lau's Aidan O'Rourke and Michael Marra.

Track listing
All songs written by Woomble/Maclean, unless otherwise noted.
 "A New Day Has Begun" (Woomble/Maclean/Jones)
 "Make Something Out of What it's Worth"
 "Work Like You Can"
 "Tangled Wire"
 "Roll Along" (Woomble/Maclean/Jones)
 "Hour After Hour" (Woomble/Maclean/Jones)
 "Leaving Without Gold"
 "New Frontier" (Woomble/Maclean/Jones)
 "Old Town"
 "Living as You Always Have"
 "Gather the Day"
 "Between the Old Moon"

Personnel

Musicians
 Roddy Woomble - lead vocals
 Sorren Maclean - acoustic and electric guitars, banjo, organ, backing vocals, vibraphone
 Gavin Fox - bass guitar, accordion
 Gregor Donaldson - drums, percussion, backing vocals
 Jill O'Sullivan - backing vocals
 Gordon Maclean - double bass, accordion ("Work Like You Can")
 Mhairi Hall - piano ("Make Something Out of What it's Worth")
 Kevin Brolly - clarinet ("Make Something Out of What it's Worth")
 Aidan O'Rourke - fiddle ("Work Like You Can", "Hour After Hour")
 Seonaid Aitken - piano ("Tangled Wire"), violin ("Leaving Without Gold"), backing vocals
 Chick Lyall - piano ("Roll Along", "New Frontier", "Between the Old Moon")
 Rob Hall - sopranino, soprano and tenor saxophones ("Roll Along", "Between the Old Moon")
 Michael Marra - organ ("Old Town")
 Phil Cunningham - accordion ("Living as You Always Have")

Production personnel
 Roddy Woomble - producer
 Gordon Maclean - recording
 Tony Doogan - mixing, additional recording
 Frank Arkwright - mastering

Artwork
 Mairi Hedderwick - artwork
 Rose Skelton - photo of Roddy
 Darren Evans - layout

References

Roddy Woomble albums
2011 albums